Lyght is a surname. Notable people with the surname include:

 Andrew Lyght (born 1949), Guyanese-American contemporary artist 
 Andrew Lyght (cricketer) (1956–2001), Guyanese cricketer
 Todd Lyght (born 1969), American football player and coach